Frans Eemil Sillanpää (16 September 1888 – 3 June 1964) was one of the most famous Finnish writers and in 1939 became the first Finnish writer to be awarded the Nobel Prize for literature "for his deep understanding of his country's peasantry and the exquisite art with which he has portrayed their way of life and their relationship with Nature". His best-known novels include  (Nuorena nukkunut) from 1931.

Early life
Frans Eemil Sillanpää was born into a peasant farming family in Hämeenkyrö. Although his parents were poor, they managed to send him to school in Tampere. At school Sillanpää was a good student and with aid from his benefactor Henrik Liljeroos he entered the University of Helsinki in 1908 to study medicine. Here his acquaintances included the painters Eero Järnefelt and Pekka Halonen, composer Jean Sibelius and author Juhani Aho.

Career
Five years later, in 1913 Sillanpää moved from Helsinki to his old home village and devoted himself to writing. In 1914 Sillanpää wrote articles for the newspaper Uusi Suometar.  In 1916 Sillanpää married Sigrid Maria Salomäki, whom he had met in 1914.

By principle, Sillanpää was against all forms of violence and believed in scientific optimism. In his work he portrayed rural people as living united with the land.

The novel Hurskas kurjuus (Meek Heritage) (1919) depicted the reasons for Finnish Civil War, and despite its objectivity, was controversial at the time.

Sillanpää won international fame for his novel Nuorena nukkunut (translated to English as The Maid Silja) in 1931.

In 1939, he was awarded the Nobel Prize in Literature "for his deep understanding of his country's peasantry and the exquisite art with which he has portrayed their way of life and their relationship with Nature." A few days after he received the prize, talks between Finland and Soviet Union broke down and the Winter War began. Sillanpää donated the golden medal to be melted for funds to aid the war effort.

Before the Winter War, Sillanpää wrote the lyrics for what is known as Sillanpään marssilaulu to lift his spirits when his eldest son Esko was partaking in military practices at Karelian Isthmus.

In 1939 his wife Sigrid died of pneumonia leaving eight children with Sillanpää. Some time after, Sillanpää married his secretary Anna von Hertzen (1900–1983) and traveled to Stockholm to receive the Nobel prize.

In 1941 Sillanpää divorced his wife Anna. His alcoholism and other ailments needed hospital treatment. In 1943 he returned to public life as a bearded old 'Grandpa Sillanpää'. His radio appearances, especially his tradition of talking on Christmas Eve from 1945 to 1963 became very popular.

The asteroid 1446 Sillanpää, discovered on January 26, 1938 by the renowned Finnish astronomer and physicist Yrjö Väisälä, was named after him.

Death
Sillanpää died on 3 June 1964 in Helsinki aged 75.

Works

 Elämä ja aurinko (1916)
 Ihmislapsia elämän saatossa (1917)
 Hurskas kurjuus (translated as Meek Heritage) (1919)
 Rakas isänmaani (1919)
 Hiltu ja Ragnar (1923)
 Enkelten suojatit (1923)
 Omistani ja omilleni (1924)
 Maan tasalta (1924)
 Töllinmäki (1925)
 Rippi (1928)
 Kiitos hetkistä, Herra... (1930)
 Nuorena nukkunut (translated as The Maid Silja) (1931)
 Miehen tie (1932)
 Virranpohjalta (1933)
 Ihmiset suviyössä (translated as People in the Summer Night) (1934)
 Viidestoista (1936)
 Elokuu (1941)
 Ihmiselon ihanuus ja kurjuus (1945)

Films

Numerous of his works have been made into films:
 Nuorena nukkunut, Teuvo Tulio. 1937
 One Man's Faith, Nyrki Tapiovaara and Hugo Hytönen. 1940
 Ihmiset suviyössä, Valentin Vaala. 1948
 Poika eli kesäänsä, Roland af Hällström. 1955 (based on novel Elämä ja aurinko)
 The Harvest Month, Matti Kassila. 1956
 Silja – nuorena nukkunut, Jack Witikka. 1956
 The Glory and Misery of Human Life, Matti Kassila. 1988

References

External links 
"The Game Behind Finland's First Nobel prize", article (in Swedish; based on documents in the Nobel Archive), first published in Svenska Dagbladet, 5 December 2009; later published in the Finnish daily newspaper Helsingin Sanomat.
 F. E. Sillanpään Seura
 
List of Works
 
 

1888 births
1964 deaths
People from Hämeenkyrö
People from Turku and Pori Province (Grand Duchy of Finland)
Writers from Pirkanmaa
Finnish Nobel laureates
Finnish-language writers
Nobel laureates in Literature
20th-century Finnish novelists